Trachymedusae belong to the phylum Cnidaria and the class Hydrozoa, among the 30 genera are 5 families containing around 50 species in all, the family Rhopalonematidae has the greatest diversity.

Description
Trachymedusae are identifiable by their umbrella edge which lacks any lobes. The tentacles at the edge of the umbrellas are solid or solid and hollow, there is a thickened tissue ring that has a large number of nematocysts, the radial canals number from 4 to 6 to 8 and more than 8, though 8 is the most common amount found. The sensory clubs can be open or closed with the endodermal axis. The gonads are generally located at the radial canal or where the radial canal and the manubrium connect. The cnidome may have stenoteles. Trachymedusae reproduce sexually during the medusae stage lacking a polyp stage.

Primarily found in the deep ocean, where they are recorded at depths of seventy to two thousand metres.

Interactions with humans
Interactions with humans are few as this species primarily occurs at great depth. Although it has been found that hydrozoans have increased in numbers in recent years, the increase in Liriope tetraphylla, a species of Trachymedusae, does not appear to be affecting the total zoo-plankton populations they prey upon within the Sea of Marmara.

References

 
Cnidarian orders
Trachylinae